"Swingin' Down the Lane" is a 1923 song composed by Isham Jones with lyrics by Gus Kahn. Jones' instrumental version was  second to "March of the Wooden Soldiers" in the list of top songs for 1923. Other popular versions in 1923 were by Ben Bernie; and The Columbians.

Other notable recordings
 Bing Crosby - recorded November 27, 1947 with John Scott Trotter and His Orchestra. 
 Frank Sinatra - included in his album Songs for Swingin' Lovers! (1956)
 Perry Como - for his album We Get Letters (1957)
 Kay Starr - for her album Movin'! (1959).
 Frankie Avalon - for his album Summer Scene (1960)
 Vic Damone - included in his album On the Swingin' Side (1960)

Film appearances
1944 Greenwich Village - performed by Vivian Blaine and Don Ameche 
1947 Mother Wore Tights - sung by Mona Freeman (dubbed by Imogene Lynn), Robert Arthur and chorus 
1951 I'll See You in My Dreams - sung during the montage with the kids

References

1923 songs
1923 singles
Songs with lyrics by Gus Kahn
Songs with music by Isham Jones